SV Vesta  is a football team located in Willemstad, Curacao, playing in the First Division of Curaçao League.
The country of Curacao was part of the Netherlands Antilles within the Dutch Kingdom until the split back in 2010.

Awards
 Curaçao Promé Divishon
 Winners (1): 2018-19

Current squad 2016–2017

References

External links

Football clubs in Curaçao
Football clubs in the Netherlands Antilles
Association football clubs established in 1974
1974 establishments in Curaçao